The Queen's Baton Relay is a relay around the world held prior to the beginning of the Commonwealth Games. The Baton carries a message from the Head of the Commonwealth, currently King Charles III. The Relay traditionally begins at Buckingham Palace in London as a part of the city's Commonwealth Day festivities. The Queen entrusts the baton to the first relay runner. At the Opening Ceremony of the Games, the final relay runner hands the baton back to the Queen or her representative, who reads the message aloud to officially open the Games. The Queen's Baton Relay is similar to the Olympic Torch Relay. As a result of the Queen's death on 8 September 2022, the Baton Relay could be renamed after her successor King Charles III for the 2026 Commonwealth Games in Victoria, Australia.

History

At the inaugural games, held in 1930 in Hamilton, Ontario, a message from King George V was read to the competitors. In 1936, Australian runner Rowley Bateman proposed a relay from Canberra to Sydney carrying a goodwill message for the 1938 Sydney games. A baton relay from Mountain Ash to Pontypridd to commemorate the centenary of the Welsh national anthem was organised in 1956 by athletics official Bernard Baldwin, who proposed something similar for the finale of the Commonwealth Games. Baldwin later founded the traditional New Year's Eve race 'Nos Galan' in Mountain Ash.

The Relay has been involved in every games since the 1958 British Empire and Commonwealth Games in Cardiff, Wales. The Relay for the 1998 Games in Kuala Lumpur, Malaysia was the first to incorporate a more expansive relay to other nations of the Commonwealth. The 2002 Commonwealth Games Relay covered over 100,000 kilometres (60,000 miles) and went through 23 nations.

Rather than beginning at Buckingham Palace, the 1970 relay began in at Yellowknife in Canada's Northwest Territories before the baton was flown to Scotland.

Editions

Final Baton Runners

See also

 Olympic Flame

Notes

References

External links
 Queen’s Baton Relay History Timeline
 Official website of 2014 Queen's Baton Relay
 BBC Coverage of 2014 Queen's Baton Relay
 2014 Queen's Baton Designers
 Official website of 2010 Queen's Baton Relay
 Official website of 2006 Queen's Baton Relay
 Queen's Baton Relay on New Zealand Commonwealth Games website
 "Queen's Baton Relay" on Gold Coast 2018 Commonwealth Games website

 
Torch relays